WIRSOL Solar AG is an international solar energy provider, specialized in the planning, financing, construction and maintenance of solar power plants of any size. The headquarters of the company is in Germany. Further company offices are located in Spain, Italy, Great Britain, Belgium, Switzerland, Canada, USA, China, Malaysia and the Maldives.

History
The company was founded in Waghäusel (District of Karlsruhe in Germany) in February 2003 by Markus Wirth, Hans Wirth and Stefan Riel as the "Hausrenovierer GmbH", where the headquarters of the firm are also located. Having specialized in the area of photovoltaics, the firm was renamed "Wirth Solar AG"  in January 2004 and from this arose the name "Wirsol Solar AG" in 2007. In the same year, the company opened the Bruhrain solar test park in close proximity to the company premises. A total surface area of 12 hectares made it the biggest solar park in the stare of Baden-Württemberg at the time. With 31,000 modules installed, the plant generates an output of up to 2.258 MWp and provides 500 households with electricity. This corresponds to a yearly CO2 saving of around 1300 tons.

In 2010, the board of directors was expanded by company founders Markus Wirth and Stefan Riel. Since then, Bernd Kästner has been the chief financial officer. Nikolaus Krane, previously part of the Conergy board, oversees international financial products, large-scale project financing and international marketing and communication. In April 2010, Wirsol installed a photovoltaic system at the German Formula One race track Hockenheimring with a rated output of 848.88 kWp. Along the 405 m-long race tracks, 4716 solar modules were installed.

In 2011, the solar energy company generated a turnover of 317 million Euros. Wirsol finalized one of its largest projects in this financial year in Mixdorf, in Brandenburg. The company built a system with a peak performance of 24.1 MWp on the 81-hectare site of a former Russian fuel depot. Likewise, in 2012, Wirsol connected the high-output Luckau Solar Park (with almost 21 MWp) to the grid on a conversion site in Brandenburg. The solar power plant originated from the former military airport called Alteno. As a result, over 4500 households can be provided with energy.

On a global level, Wirsol is responsible for the installation of over 6200 solar systems with a total output of 440 MWp. Systems in operation reach a total CO2 saving of over 180,000 tons per year.
So as to further promote good business relations with Asia, Wirsol co-founder Stefan Riel relocated to Beijing as the first top-manager of the German solar sector and created a company location in China with Wirsol Solar Technology Beijing Ltd. In June 2012, Wirsol opened a location in Kuala Lumpur in Malaysia to coordinate activities in Southeast Asia.

Between October 2013 and January 2014, several subsidiaries of the company Wirsol Solar AG initiated insolvency proceedings. Assets including the brand name were acquired by Wircon GmbH (founded by Dietmar Hopp) in March 2014.

In 2014, WIRSOL Energy Ltd. was founded in the United Kingdom by Mark Hogan, alongside Markus Wirth and Peter Vest (of WIRCON GmbH), separate to the previous ventures under WIRCON GmbH, and previous entity Wirsol Solar AG.

International projects
In 2012, the company founded the joint venture named "Wirsol RE Maldives" with REM (Renewable Energy Maldives), where solar power stations have already been installed on six of the Maldive islands and where electricity is supplied to schools and hospitals. Further significant international projects have been finalized by Wirsol in Spain (Barcelona, Bovera), Italy (Mola di Bari), Belgium (Schilde), (Jambes) and Colorado (Fort Collins). In 2013, the company announced the start of construction of a solar park on the Japanese island of Honschu and the starting signal for the Monte Plata solar park on the Dominican Republic. In 2015, the company built the Lerchenborg solar park (61 MWp), the largest solar park in Scandinavia. In January 2017, the company announced the commissioning of the largest solar park in the Netherlands with a total output of 30 MWp. 

In March 2017 Wirsol entered the Australian market with investments of $380 million and the establishment of a subsidiary with an office in Sydney. As for 2020, projects in Australia include large-scale solar farms and battery storage solutions including, Wemen Solar Farm, (Wemen, Victoria), Clermont Solar Farm (Clermont, Queensland), Whitsunday Solar Farm (Collinsville, Queensland), Hamilton Solar Farm (Collinsville, Queensland), Gannawarra Solar Farm (Kerang, Victoria) and Gannawarra Energy Storage System (Kerang, Victoria). In April 2017, the company was able to report the connection of 19 solar parks. The 19 solar sites in England and Northern Ireland each generate between 20.5 MWp and 2.5 MWp and deliver a total of 105.5 MWp of energy. In March 2018, Wirsol Energy and Edify Energy were awarded a state tender for large storage systems in Australia.

Sponsoring
From 2011/2012 Bundesliga football season, Wirsol Solar AG has been the official sponsor of TSG 1899 Hoffenheim. In Sinsheim, Wirsol gave the Wirsol Rhein-Neckar Arena its name. This is where 1899 Hoffenheim hold their home games. Since the second half of the 2019/20 season, the stadion got a new naming partner. The former Wirsol Rhein-Neckar-Arena is now called PreZero Arena, which is a brand of German Green Cycle GmbH.

References

Solar energy in Germany
Technology companies of Germany
Companies based in Baden-Württemberg
Renewable energy technology companies
Photovoltaics